WWE Heroes is an American celebrity comics comic book series, published by Titan Magazines. The series is written by Keith Champagne and the artwork is composed by Andy Smith. It stars WWE's most popular wrestlers, such as John Cena, The Undertaker, Randy Orton, Batista and Triple H.

The first issue was released in April 2010 with a continual storyline called Rise of the Firstborn. A different but similar story continues in the Undertaker's 2-part issue.

Overview

See also

List of wrestling-based comic books
WWE Books
WWE Magazine

References

External links

WWE
Professional wrestling comics
Comics based on real people